Pila Island is a small island  west of the Flat Islands in Holme Bay, Mac. Robertson Land. Mapped by Norwegian cartographers from air photos taken by the Lars Christensen Expedition, 1936–37, and named Pila (the arrow).

See also 
 List of Antarctic and sub-Antarctic islands

Islands of Mac. Robertson Land